John Whitgift Academy (formerly known as Whitgift School) is a co-educational secondary school with academy status in Grimsby, North East Lincolnshire, England. The academy is a part of Delta Academies Trust.

Admissions
The school became John Whitgift Academy in September 2011. There are around 530 pupils. It serves the areas of Great Coates, The Willows and Wybers Wood, although it has an intake from across Grimsby now that it has its own transport. The school has been described as "based in a large area of a former council estate... Families moving into that area have Whitgift school at the heart of their community, which is also an area with some deprivation".

History
It is named after John Whitgift, a native of Grimsby and Archbishop of Canterbury from 1583 to 1604. Crosland Road, where the school was built, was named after Anthony Crosland the former (pre-1977) MP for Great Grimsby. Crosland implemented Comprehensive Education across the UK, specifically removing most grammar schools. Until April 1974 the school was administered by the County Borough of Grimsby Education Committee, then Humberside Education Committee in Beverley. The school became known as Whitgift Comprehensive School.

It became a specialist sports college in 2006.

Whitgift Film Theatre
The school has the 203-seat Whitgift Film Theatre. This is the only school in the UK with such a building, and was built as part of the school when the British Film Institute wanted a network of regional film theatres. It opened on 28 September 1972, showing Gumshoe, around the same time that Doncaster Film Theatre opened. There were 45 BFI-funded regional film theatres in the UK at that point. It became known as Grimsby Film Theatre.

From 1992 to 2000, it was known as Grimsby Screen. The cinema was bought from (former) Grimsby council when it was going to be closed by a group of amateurs who also had in their possession a large film library. The commercial operation briefly closed in April 2005 due to competition from the nine-screen Parkway Cinema in Cleethorpes which opened in November 2004 but the group of amateurs stepped in two weeks later. It used to be Grimsby's only cinema, until the Odeon was re-opened as The Regal on Freeman Street.

Academic performance

In 2018/19, the school's Progress 8 measure was Well Above Average. The proportion of pupils achieving Grade 5 or above in English & maths GCSEs was 39%, above the local authority average of 34%, though below the national average of 43%. The proportion of pupils entered for the English Baccalaureate was 2%, compared to 37% in the local authority and 40% nationally. The Attainment 8 score was 46, compared to 41 for the local authority and 47 nationally.

The school's rate of exclusions in 2016/17 was very high, almost one in four children being excluded, the fifteenth-highest rate nationally.

Attendance in 2018/19 was in line with the national figures.

Inspection judgements

As of 2020, the school's most recent Ofsted judgement was Good.

The previous judgement, in 2017, was Requires Improvement.

The rapid improvement in inspections may be down to the hard work of the new head teacher Robert Spendlow and his staff. 
Pupils are more well behaved due to the higher expectations and discipline in place.

Alumni
 Helen Fospero, television presenter
 Ian Huntley (1985–90)

See also
 List of schools in Yorkshire and the Humber

References

External links
 Whitgift School website
 History of film theatre
 School Profile
 EduBase

Cinemas in Lincolnshire
Educational institutions established in 1972
Academies in the Borough of North East Lincolnshire
Schools in Grimsby
Secondary schools in the Borough of North East Lincolnshire
1972 establishments in England
School buildings in the United Kingdom destroyed by arson
Delta schools